is a Japanese wrestler. He won the silver medal in the 74 kg class in the men's freestyle wrestling competition at the 2010 Asian Games in Guangzhou, China.

References

External links
 

Japanese male sport wrestlers
1981 births
People from Gunma Prefecture
Asian Games medalists in wrestling
Living people
Wrestlers at the 2010 Asian Games
Medalists at the 2010 Asian Games
Asian Games silver medalists for Japan
20th-century Japanese people
21st-century Japanese people